Corfield may refer to:

Corfield, Queensland,  a locality in the Shire of Winton, Queensland, Australia
K. G. Corfield Ltd, British photography company
Corfield v. Coryell, 1823 US federal circuit court case

People
Bernard Corfield, Bishop of Travancore and Cochin
Charles Corfield, British mathematician
Conrad Corfield (1893–1980), British civil servant 
Corrie Corfield (born 1961), British newsreader
David Corfield, British philosopher
Ella Corfield (nee Caird), British pharmacist
Frederick Corfield (1915–2005), British politician
Hermione Corfield (born 1993), British film and television actress
Joe Corfield (1895–1970), Australian footballer
Kenneth Corfield (1924-2016), camera designer, engineer and businessman 
Lu Corfield, Welsh actress
Richard Corfield (1882–1913), British colonial police officer 
Sid Corfield (1883–1941), English footballer 
William Henry Corfield (1843-1903), hygienist
William Henry Corfield (1843-1927, politician
Wilmot Corfield (1859–1919), British philatelist

See also
William Corfield (disambiguation)